The 2012 Macedonian Handball Cup was the 20th edition of the Macedonian Handball Cup. It took place at the Boris Trajkovski Sports Center in Skopje, Republic of Macedonia, between 18 and 20 May 2012. The cup was won by RK Vardar PRO for the eight time.

Venue

Knockout stage

Semifinals

Final

See also
2011–12 Macedonian Handball Super League

References

External links
Official website
Handball news

Handball in North Macedonia
2012 in handball